This is a list of female cabinet ministers of Israel.

Numerical order represents the order of first appointment to the cabinet.Age represents age on appointment to that office.

See also
Cabinet
Cabinet of Israel
Politics of Israel

External links
 List of female cabinet ministers of Israel

 
Ministers
 
Israel
Ministers
Cabinet ministers